The Hjartdøla Power Station  is a hydroelectric power station located in Hjartdal, Vestfold og Telemark, Norway.

See also

References 

Hydroelectric power stations in Norway
Buildings and structures in Vestfold og Telemark